In enzymology, a lipid-A-disaccharide synthase is an enzyme that catalyzes the chemical reaction
UDP-2,3-bis(3-hydroxytetradecanoyl)glucosamine + 2,3-bis(3-hydroxytetradecanoyl)-beta-D-glucosaminyl 1-phosphate  UDP + 2,3-bis(3-hydroxytetradecanoyl)-D-glucosaminyl-1,6-beta-D-2,3-bis(3-hydroxytetradecanoyl)-beta-D-glucosaminyl 1-phosphate

Thus, the two substrates of this enzyme are UDP-2,3-bis(3-hydroxytetradecanoyl)glucosamine and 2,3-bis(3-hydroxytetradecanoyl)-beta-D-glucosaminyl 1-phosphate, whereas its 2 products are UDP and 2,3-bis(3-hydroxytetradecanoyl)-D-glucosaminyl-1,6-beta-D-2,3-bis(3-hydroxytetradecanoyl)-beta-D-glucosaminyl 1-phosphate.

This enzyme belongs to the family of glycosyltransferases, specifically the hexosyltransferases.  The systematic name of this enzyme class is UDP-2,3-bis(3-hydroxytetradecanoyl)glucosamine:2,3-bis(3-hydroxytet radecanoyl)-beta-D-glucosaminyl-1-phosphate 2,3-bis(3-hydroxytetradecanoyl)-glucosaminyltransferase. This enzyme participates in lipopolysaccharide biosynthesis.

References 

 
 

EC 2.4.1
Enzymes of unknown structure